Mario Bailey (born November 30, 1970) is a retired American football wide receiver who is the all-time reception leader in NFL Europe. He played for the Frankfurt Galaxy from 1995 through 2000 and was a favorite player for the local German fans.

Bailey was selected by the Houston Oilers in the sixth round of the 1992 NFL Draft. He was also drafted by the Orlando Rage of the XFL with the 52nd pick in the 2001 XFL Draft. In 2003, Bailey played in the Arena Football League with the Detroit Fury.

Bailey is a former high school football coach at his alma mater, Franklin High School in Seattle, Washington, and is a member of the Seattle Seahawks high school council.

College football
After high school at Franklin, Bailey had a record-breaking college football career nearby at the University of Washington from 1988 through 1991 under head coach Don James. He played a key role as a senior in 1991 on the Huskies' national championship team, and holds the Husky records for touchdowns in a season (18), career (30), and shares the record with several others for touchdowns in a game.

1989 - 25 catches for 357 yards and 3 TD.
1990 - 40 catches for 667 yards and 6 TD.
1991 - 62 catches for 1,037 yards and 17 TD.

Bailey and NFL tight end Aaron Pierce were teammates at Franklin and Washington.

See also
 Washington Huskies football statistical leaders

References

 Washington Football 2007 Media Guide

External links
https://web.archive.org/web/20071008091749/http://www.cheddarheads.co.uk/hof/mario.htm
https://www.youtube.com/watch?v=RDAgQNZFz2o

1970 births
Living people
All-American college football players
American football wide receivers
Frankfurt Galaxy players
High school football coaches in Washington (state)
Orlando Rage players
Players of American football from Seattle
Washington Huskies football players
Franklin High School (Seattle) alumni
American expatriate players of American football
American expatriate sportspeople in Germany